Yassine Bounou (born 5 April 1991), also known as Bono, is a Moroccan professional footballer who plays as a goalkeeper for La Liga club Sevilla and the Morocco national team.

Bono began his youth career in Morocco, playing for Wydad AC. He spent most of his senior career in Spain, making over 100 La Liga appearances for Girona and Sevilla, and 56 in the Segunda División for Zaragoza and Girona. He won the UEFA Europa League with Sevilla in 2020.

Born in Canada to Moroccan parents, Bounou returned with his family to Morocco at the age of three. He has been a full international for Morocco since 2013. Having previously played for the under-23 team at the 2012 Olympics, he has represented his nation at two FIFA World Cup and three Africa Cup of Nations tournaments.

Club career

Early career 
Bounou was born in Montreal, Quebec to Moroccan parents. His father is originally from the region of Taounate. Bounou and his parents moved to Casablanca, Morocco when he was 3 years old. He began playing in the streets as a child and joined Wydad AC at 8 years old in 1999. He liked to play using his feet, but due to his height it was later suggested he become a goalkeeper; a challenge he accepted. His goalkeeping idols were Gianluigi Buffon and Edwin van der Sar. His parents initially had mixed feelings regarding their son spending so much time playing football, but they later became more supportive as his talent became more evident. At 17 years old, his goalkeeping skills were spotted by a scout from OGC Nice, and he signed with the club; however due to bureaucratic problems he ended up not playing for Nice, and he returned to Wydad AC. In 2011, he made his senior debut in the club, after having been promoted to the first-team a year earlier.

Atlético Madrid 
On 14 June 2012, Bounou moved to La Liga club Atlético Madrid, being initially assigned to the reserves in Segunda División. He appeared regularly for the team on the bench as a third keeper, and signed a new four-year deal on 31 May 2013. In the summer of 2014, after profiting from Thibaut Courtois and Daniel Aranzubia's departures, he was definitively promoted to the main squad. He made his first-team debut on 24 July 2014, in a 1–0 pre-season friendly win against Numancia.

Zaragoza 
On 1 September 2014, Bounou was loaned to the Segunda División's Real Zaragoza, in a season-long deal. Kept out by Óscar Whalley for the first half of the campaign, he made his debut the following 11 January in a 5–3 loss at UD Las Palmas, and finished the season with 16 appearances. In the play-offs, after Whalley's performance led to a 0–3 home loss to Girona FC in the first leg, Bounou replaced him in the second for a 4–1 win and advancement on away goals; Zaragoza lost the final by the same rule to UD Las Palmas. On 23 July 2015, he returned to the Aragonese side, again in a one-year loan deal.

Girona 
On 12 July 2016, Bounou signed a permanent two-year contract with fellow league team Girona. He played exactly half of games in his first season – sharing with René Román – as they were promoted in second place. In January 2019, now first choice at the top-flight club, he extended his contract until June 2021.

Sevilla 
On 2 September 2019, after suffering relegation with the Catalans, Bounou joined Sevilla in the top tier, on loan for one year. Second-choice to Tomáš Vaclík in the league season, he played regularly in the domestic cup and as the side won the 2019–20 UEFA Europa League, earning plaudits for his performance against Wolverhampton Wanderers in the quarter-finals as he saved a penalty from Raúl Jiménez to earn a 1–0 win, also in the 2–1 semi-final win over Manchester United, and eventually his decisive save of Romelu Lukaku's one-on-one strike, to win the final 3–2 against Inter Milan.

On 4 September 2020, Bounou signed a permanent four-year contract with the Andalusians. The following 21 March, in the last minute of a match against Real Valladolid, he scored his first goal as a professional goalkeeper to secure a 1–1 draw.

In the year 2021, Bounou kept 32 clean sheets in 59 games for club and country, the most for any goalkeeper in Europe's top five leagues. Second place was Ederson of Manchester City and Brazil, with 30 in 59. 

On 27 February 2022, Bonou assisted a goal by international teammate Munir El Haddadi in a 2–1 win over Real Betis in the Seville derby, With this pass, Bono reached his fourth contribution with Seville (three passes and a goal). In April, his contract was extended by one year to 2025.

International career
 

Bounou was eligible to represent Canada or Morocco, but opted to represent the latter, appearing with the under-20 team at the 2012 Toulon Tournament, playing in one match during the competition. He was also selected in the 18-man under-23 squad for the 2012 Summer Olympics, but acted as a backup to Mohamed Amsif during the tournament, in which Morocco were eliminated at the group stage.

In an interview, Bounou said that he had been contacted by the manager of the Canada national team, Benito Floro, but that this ultimately did not materialise. Moreover, he said to the interviewer that he grew up in Morocco, and deep down dreamed of representing the Moroccan national team.

On 14 August 2013, Bounou was called up to the main squad for a friendly match against Burkina Faso. He made his debut in the following day, playing the entire second half of an eventual 1–2 defeat in Tangier.

In May 2018 Bounou was named in Morocco's 23-man squad for the World Cup in Russia, At the 2019 Africa Cup of Nations in Egypt he was first choice for Hervé Renard's team, keeping clean sheets in 1–0 wins over Namibia and the Ivory Coast to qualify for the last 16.

Bounou was also called up for the 2021 Africa Cup of Nations in Cameroon. At the tournament, he made headlines for his defence of Arabic and refusal to speak to the press in French or English; a jab at the African Nations Cup for not having hired a single Arabic translator.

On 10 November 2022, Bounou was named in Morocco's 26-man squad for the 2022 FIFA World Cup in Qatar. He made two saves during the round of 16 penalty shoot-out against Spain, leading to Morocco qualifying for the quarter-finals for the first time in their history, where they won 1–0 against Portugal, becoming the first African team to reach the semi-finals. He kept three clean sheets, joint best with Jordan Pickford of England and Emiliano Martínez of winners Argentina; he was the first African to reach three clean sheets at a World Cup.

Career statistics

Club

International

Honours
Wydad AC
Botola: 2009–10
CAF Champions League runner-up: 2011

Atlético Madrid
La Liga: 2013–14

Sevilla
UEFA Europa League: 2019–20
UEFA Super Cup runner-up: 2020

Individual
La Liga Zamora Trophy: 2021–22
UEFA Europa League Squad of the Season: 2019–20
La Liga Best African Player: 2021–22
La Liga Team of the Season: 2021–22
IFFHS Africa Team of The Year: 2022
Best Moroccan goalkeeper abroad: 2021–22
Castore Player of the Month: January 2023

Orders
Order of the Throne: 2022

References

External links

Profile at the Sevilla FC website

1991 births
Living people
Citizens of Morocco through descent
Moroccan footballers
Footballers from Casablanca
Morocco international footballers
Soccer players from Montreal
Canadian people of Moroccan descent
Canadian soccer players
Canadian expatriate sportspeople in Spain
Association football goalkeepers
Botola players
Wydad AC players
La Liga players
Segunda División players
Segunda División B players
Atlético Madrid B players
Real Zaragoza players
Girona FC players
Sevilla FC players
Moroccan expatriate footballers
Moroccan expatriate sportspeople in Spain
Expatriate footballers in Spain
Olympic footballers of Morocco
Footballers at the 2012 Summer Olympics
2017 Africa Cup of Nations players
2018 FIFA World Cup players
2019 Africa Cup of Nations players
2021 Africa Cup of Nations players
2022 FIFA World Cup players
UEFA Europa League winning players